Prehen House is a privately owned 18th-century Irish Georgian house at Prehen in County Londonderry.

Thought to have been designed by local architect Michael Priestley, it was built in 1740 for Andrew Knox, M.P. for Donegal, after he married Prehen heiress Honoria Tomkins two years earlier.  Andrew Knox's family owned the house for 170 years. After being seized by the government after the 1914–18 war, Prehen House was brought back into another branch of the Knox family.

The Department of the Environment has listed Prehen as a grade A building of national importance.

Prehen House is home to one of Ireland's greatest love stories, the legend of Half Hung MacNaghten.

The Northern Ireland Tourist Board considers Prehen House one of region's most historic houses.  The house has also been a European Heritage Open Days site.

References

External links
Prehen House
Northern Ireland Tourist Board profile of the Coach House

Buildings and structures in County Londonderry
Grade A listed buildings
Houses completed in 1740
1740 establishments in Ireland